"Sé Que Te Vas" is the title of a song written and recorded by American duo performer Ha*Ash. It was first included on Ha*Ash' 1st live album "Primera Fila: Hecho Realidad" featuring Mexican group Matisse and then recorded live for his edition deluxe in 2016. A solo version was released on April 24, 2016. The music video of the song is the live performance by Ha*Ash in Estudios Churubusco, City Mexico on 7 July 2014. The song then included on their live album Ha*Ash: En Vivo (2019). It was written by Ashley Grace, Hanna Nicole and Pablo Preciado.

Background and release 
"Sé Que Te Vas" was written by Ashley Grace, Hanna Nicole and Pablo Preciado and produced by George Noriega, Tim Mitchell and Pablo De La Loza. Is a song recorded by American duo Ha*Ash from her live album Primera Fila: Hecho Realidad. A solo version it was released as the sixth single from the album on April 26, 2016, by Sony Music Entertainment.

Music video 
A music video for "Sé Que Te Vas" featuring Matisse was released on May 6, 2015. It was directed by Nahuel Lerena. The video was filmed in Estudios Churubusco, City Mexico. , the video has over 210 million views on YouTube.

The second music video for "Sé Que Te Vas" (solo version) was released on June 10, 2016. , the video has over 51 million views on YouTube.

The third video for "Sé Que Te Vas", recorded live for the live album Ha*Ash: En Vivo, was released on December 6, 2019. The video was filmed in Auditorio Nacional, Mexico City.

Commercial performance 
The track peaked at number 28 in the Mexico Espanol Airplay and at number 16 in the Monitor Latino on México. The song was certified gold in México.

Credits and personnel 
Credits adapted from AllMusic.

Recording and management

 Recording Country: México
 Sony / ATV Discos Music Publishing LLC / Westwood Publishing
 (P) 2014 Sony Music Entertainment US Latin LLC
 (P) 2016 Sony Music Entertainment US Latin LLC

Ha*Ash
 Ashley Grace  – vocals, guitar, songwriting
 Hanna Nicole  – vocals, guitar, piano, songwriting
Additional personnel
 Pablo De La Loza  – chorus, production
 Pablo Preciado  – songwriting
 Paul Forat  – A&R. programming, production
 Ezequiel Ghilardi  – bass
 Gonzalo Herrerias  – A&R
 George Noriega  – producer
 Tim Mitchell  – producer

Cover versions 
In June 2015, Mexican band Matisse recorded a cover version for her album Sube (Deluxe).

Charts

Certifications

Awards and nominations

Release history

References 

Ha*Ash songs
Songs written by Ashley Grace
Songs written by Hanna Nicole
Songs written by Pablo Preciado
Song recordings produced by George Noriega
Song recordings produced by Tim Mitchell
2016 singles
2016 songs
Spanish-language songs
Pop ballads
Sony Music Latin singles
2010s ballads